Sir John Bayley Darvall  (19 November 1809 – 28 December 1883) was an Australian barrister, politician and beneficiary of slavery. He was a member of the New South Wales Legislative Council between 1844 and 1856 and again between 1861 and 1863. He was also a member of the New South Wales Legislative Assembly for three periods between 1856 and 1865.  He held the positions of Solicitor General and Attorney General in a number of short-lived colonial governments.

Early life
Darvall was born into an upper-middle-class Yorkshire family and was educated at Eton and Trinity College, Cambridge. Subsequently, he was articled to his uncle, Sir John Bayley at the Middle Temple and was called to the English Bar in 1838. He was an awardee of a compensation claim made for 264 slaves totalling £3,461.

He emigrated to Sydney in 1839 and established a large, private legal practice. Darvall accrued significant agricultural and pastoral interests and was a director of several colonial companies, a number of which failed in the depression of the early 1840s. He declined a judgeship in Victoria in 1851 and was appointed as a Queen's Counsel in 1857, a CMG in 1869 and a KCMG in 1877. Darvall returned to England in 1865 and continued in legal practice. He was a great-uncle of Banjo Paterson and related through his sister Emily Mary Barton.

Parliament
On 24 July 1844, prior to the establishment of responsible self-government, Darvall was appointed to the New South Wales Legislative Council. He was a loyal supporter of the government until, unable to support the continuing nomination of members, he resigned in 1848. He was then elected to the Council, initially for the seat of County of Bathurst and between 1851 and 1856 as the member for County of Cumberland. Darvall styled himself as a "Patrician Liberal" and was a supporter of John Dunmore Lang and Charles Cowper. He opposed the 1853 Constitution Bill of William Charles Wentworth because of its provision for an hereditary upper house.

Following the granting of self-government, Darvall was elected to the first Legislative Assembly as one of the two members for the seat of Cumberland (North Riding). He was surprisingly appointed as the Solicitor General in the conservative and short-lived government of Stuart Donaldson. He was also Solicitor General 6 June to 25 August 1856 and 3 October 1856 to 23 May 1857 then Attorney-General 26 May to 7 September 1857 in the government of Henry Parker. Darvall became concerned by the effects of manhood suffrage and the colony's liberal land distribution schemes and resigned from the Assembly in November 1857. He subsequently joined the conservative Constitutional Association and was elected in their interest for the seat of Hawkesbury at the 1859 election. His opposition to the Free Selection of Crown Lands led to significant dissension in the electorate and he did not contest the 1860 election.

While opposed to parliamentary nominations, he nevertheless accepted a nomination to the Legislative Council in 1861. He used his period in the Council to press for its conversion into an elected house and for a limitation on its powers over money bills. However, at the same time, he also expressed concerns at the excesses of colonial democracy. He resigned from the Council in June 1863 to successfully contest a by-election for the seat of East Maitland and on re-entering the assembly he almost immediately accepted the position of Attorney-General in the liberal government of Charles Cowper. Cowper's government fell in October of that year and at the subsequent election he was elected as one of the four members for West Sydney. He was again made Attorney-General on 3 February 1865 by Cowper but resigned on 20 June 1865 to return to England.

References

 

1809 births
1883 deaths
People educated at Eton College
Members of the New South Wales Legislative Assembly
Members of the New South Wales Legislative Council
Attorneys General of the Colony of New South Wales
Solicitors General for New South Wales
19th-century Australian politicians
Knights Commander of the Order of St Michael and St George
Australian King's Counsel
English barristers